Count  was a Japanese politician and diplomat during the Meiji period. He served as the 3rd Chairman of the Chamber of Elders and Japan's 4th Foreign Minister.

Early life
Terashima was born to a samurai family in Satsuma Domain (in what is now part of Akune, Kagoshima Prefecture). He studied rangaku and was appointed as a physician to Satsuma daimyō Shimazu Nariakira. In 1862, he was chosen as a member of the group of students selected by the Tokugawa bakufu to study at the University College London in Great Britain. He also visited France, the Netherlands, Belgium, Russia and Portugal. He returned to Japan in 1863, and participated in the defense of Satsuma during the Anglo-Satsuma War.

Meiji bureaucrat

After the Meiji Restoration, Terashima was appointed a san'yo (junior councilor) in the new Meiji government. In 1873, he was appointed foreign minister, and negotiated the Treaty of Saint Petersburg (1875), which fixed the national boundaries between Japan and the Russian Empire. His efforts to re-negotiate the unequal treaties with the United States failed at the last minute due to British opposition. Terashima was also responsible for the negotiations during the Maria Luz Incident involving a Peruvian ship carrying indentured labor Chinese laborers stopping in Japan.

As Governor of Kanagawa Prefecture, he was responsible for connecting Tokyo and Yokohama by telegraph in 1868.

He later served in the Genrōin (Chamber of Elders), and as the chairman of Genrōin between 1881 and 1882. In 1891, he became vice president of the Privy Council.

References 
 Auslin, Michael R. (2004).   Negotiating with Imperialism: The Unequal Treaties and the Culture of Japanese Diplomacy. Cambridge: Harvard University Press. ; OCLC 56493769
 Cobbing, Andrew. The Japanese Discovery of Victorian Britain. RoutledgeCurzon, London, 1998. 
 Jansen, Marius B. (2000). The Making of Modern Japan. Cambridge: Harvard University Press. ; OCLC 44090600
 Keene, Donald. (2002). Emperor of Japan: Meiji and His World, 1852-1912. New York: Columbia University Press. ; OCLC 46731178

See also

Japanese students in the United Kingdom

1832 births
1893 deaths
Samurai
People from Satsuma Domain
Japanese expatriates in the United Kingdom
Japanese diplomats
People of Meiji-period Japan
Shimazu retainers
Kazoku
Foreign ministers of Japan
Alumni of University College London
Governors of Kanagawa Prefecture